Bill Bergson is a fictional character created by Swedish writer Astrid Lindgren. The first book featuring him was published in 1946.

Lindgren's detective story is about Bill Bergson, a more-or-less ordinary Swedish boy with an extraordinary fascination with detective work. He lives in the small town . He identifies clues, investigates enigmas, and solves the riddle surrounding a mysterious stranger while the police and other adults overlook or dismiss the whole matter. He and his friends several times solve real crimes including mysterious thefts murder and kidnapping. Lindgren wrote shorthand for Harry Söderman, a doctor in criminology, and it was during this work that she learned the basics of criminology that she later used in her stories.

Bill and his friends also play a game they call the Wars of the Roses. He, along with his two friends Anders and Eva-Lotta, are the White Rose, while three other kids, Sixten, Jonte and Benka, are the Red Rose. The group that does not have the stone must use all their wits and energy to obtain it. The group that has the stone must give the other group clues on where to find it.

Although there is a "war" between the two roses, all six of the youngsters are good friends and there is simply a playful rivalry between them. The Red Roses help the Whites when they are threatened by real dangers.

Lindgren wrote three books about Bill Bergson: 
 1946 – Bill Bergson, Master Detective
 1951 – Bill Bergson Lives Dangerously
 1953 – Bill Bergson and the White Rose Rescue
and three theater plays:
 1950 –  (published in the book , based on the novel )
 1955 – Mästerdetektiven Kalle Blomkvist: För kasperteater två korta akter (published in the book  by Elsa Olenius, new story)
 1968 – Kalle Blomkvist, Nisse Nöjd och Vicke på Vind (published in the book , new story)

English translations
Viking edition
 1952 – Bill Bergson, Master Detective/. Translated from the Swedish by Herbert Antoine; illustrated by Louis S. Glanzman. 200 pages; illustrations; 21 cm. New York: Viking Press, 1952, 1957 reprinted in Viking Seafarer ed. 1968. LCCN: 52-12922  
 1954 – Bill Bergson Lives Dangerously/. Translated from the Swedish by Herbert Antoine; illustrated by Don Freeman. 214 pages; illustrations; 21 cm. New York, Viking Press, 1954, reprinted 1965. LCCN: 54-4337
 1965 – Bill Bergson and the White Rose Rescue/. Translated from the Swedish by Florence Lamborn; illustrated by Don Freeman. 215 pages; illustrations; 21 cm. New York: Viking Press, 1965. LCCN: 65-13358

Oxford edition
 2017 – Master Detective/. Translated by Susan Beard. 170 pages; 20 cm. Oxford: Oxford University Press, 2017.  (paperback)
 2017 – Living Dangerously/. Translated by Susan Beard. 211 pages ; 20 cm. Oxford: Oxford University Press, 2017 
 2018 – The White Rose Rescue/. Translated by Susan Beard. 197 pages; 20 cm. Oxford: Oxford University Press,  2018.

Films about Bill Bergson
 1947 – Bill Bergson, Master Detective
 1953 – Bill Bergson and the White Rose Rescue
 1957 – Bill Bergson Lives Dangerously
 1966 – Mästerdetektiven Blomkvist på nya äventyr
 1996 – Bill Bergson Lives Dangerously (re-make)
 1997 – Bill Bergson and the White Rose Rescue (re-make)

Legacy
The character Mikael Blomkvist in Stieg Larsson's Millennium Trilogy is dubbed "Kalle Blomkvist" by the press to mock him in his investigative reporting. Lisbeth Salander's name appears to be taken from Eva-Lotta Lisander, and is modeled in most other respect on Lindgren's other famous character, Pippi Longstocking.

In The Girl with the Dragon Tattoo, three of Lindgren's books are mentioned: The Children of Noisy Village, Bill Bergson and the White Rose Rescue (although in the book the translation was Kalle Blomkvist and Rasmus from the original ), and Pippi Longstocking.

The relation between Astrid Lindgren and, at least, the first part of the Trilogy, can be taken farther when the fact that, in it, a cat is named 'Tjorven', is considered. The name comes from the Swedish television series Vi på Saltkråkan based on a script by Astrid Lindgren and not originally a book. Apart from this, the TV show dates from the early sixties, around the time when, in Stieg Larsson's novel, one of the crucial events which shapes the story takes place.

See also

Rövarspråket
Encyclopedia Brown
The Hardy Boys
Nancy Drew
The Adventures of Tintin

References

Astrid Lindgren characters
Fictional amateur detectives
Male characters in literature
Fictional Swedish people
Literary characters introduced in 1946
Book series introduced in 1946
Thriller film characters